Protein Hook homolog 1 is a protein that in humans is encoded by the HOOK1 gene.

Function 

This gene encodes a member of the hook family of coiled coil proteins, which bind to microtubules and organelles through their N- and C-terminal domains, respectively. The encoded protein localizes to discrete punctuate subcellular structures, and interacts with several members of the Rab GTPase family involved in endocytosis. It is thought to link endocytic membrane trafficking to the microtubule cytoskeleton. Several alternatively spliced transcript variants have been identified, but the full-length nature of some of these variants has not been determined.

References

Further reading